is a video game developed and published by Takara for the Sega Saturn.

Gameplay

SteamGear Mash is a game featuring three-dimensional play in 3/4 perspective, and solving puzzles.

Development and release

Reception

Next Generation reviewed SteamGear Mash, rating it two stars out of five, stating that "It's doubtful, in the end, with its cartoon-style graphics and brightly colored backgrounds, that this particular title will make much of an impact in the US." Readers of the Japanese Sega Saturn Magazine voted to give the game a 7.1546 out of 10 score, ranking at the number 609 spot.

Notes

References

External links 
 SteamGear Mash at GameFAQs
 SteamGear Mash at MobyGames

1995 video games
Sega Saturn games
 Tamsoft video games